Pépé le Moko is a 1937 French film directed by Julien Duvivier starring Jean Gabin, based on a novel of the same name by Henri La Barthe and with sets by Jacques Krauss. An example of the 1930s French movement known as poetic realism, it recounts the trapping of a gangster on the run in Algiers, who believes that he is safe from arrest in the Casbah.

Plot
Pépé le Moko, a criminal on the run from the police in Metropolitan France, lives with his gang in the Casbah quarter of Algiers where he is beyond the reach of the local police. They seek ways to lure him out of his refuge and a plot results in the death of a fellow gangster, but not of Pépé. The wily Inspector Slimane sees his chance when he learns that Pépé, who is fed up with his enforced exile and with his mistress Inès, has been struck by meeting the glamorous French tourist Gaby, mistress of a visiting businessman. When Gaby agrees to an afternoon assignation in Pépé's hideout, Slimane leads her to believe that Pépé has been killed and she reluctantly stays with her lover, who immediately books a passage back to France. When Pépé is informed that Gaby is about to leave Algiers, he leaves the Casbah to find her and is arrested at the harbour by Slimane. As he watches the ship take her away for ever, he commits suicide with a knife.

Cast
 Jean Gabin as Pépé le Moko
 Gabriel Gabrio as Carlos
 Mireille Balin as Gaby Gould, the beautiful Parisienne
 Saturnin Fabre as Le Grand Père
 Fernand Charpin as Régis
 Lucas Gridoux as Inspecteur Slimane
 Gilbert Gil as Pierrot
 Marcel Dalio as L'Arbi
 Charles Granval as Maxime
 Gaston Modot as Jimmy
 René Bergeron as Inspecteur Meunier
 Paul Escoffier as Chief Inspecteur Louvain
 Roger Legris as Max
 Jean Témerson as Gravèr
 Robert Ozanne as Gendron
 Philippe Richard as Janvier
 Georges Péclet as Barsac
 Line Noro as Inès
 Fréhel as Tania
 Olga Lord as Aïcha
 Renée Carl as La mère Tarte

Production
Principal photography for the film was shot at a replica of the Casbah at Joinville-le-Pont, near Paris, and only exterior shots were filmed in Algiers. Lead actress Mireille Balin never set foot in Algeria during the making of the film.

Critical reception

Rotten Tomatoes reports an approval rating of 100% based on 31 reviews, with an average rating of 8.65/10. Metacritic reports a score of 98, based on 12 reviews, indicating "universal acclaim".

English author Graham Greene in a review of the film for The Spectator asserted: "One of the most exciting and moving films I can remember seeing". It succeeds in "raising the thriller to a poetic level". According to a BBC documentary, it served as inspiration for Greene's screenplay for The Third Man. It has many similarities with the American film Casablanca, which was released a few years later.

Remakes
The film was remade in America in 1938 as Algiers, starring Hedy Lamarr and Charles Boyer, and again in 1948 as Casbah, a musical starring Tony Martin, Märta Torén, Yvonne de Carlo, and Peter Lorre. The title character's French accent and womanizing, as portrayed by Charles Boyer in the 1938 remake, inspired the name and comic premise of the Looney Tunes cartoon character, Pepé Le Pew, introduced in 1945.

References

External links
 
 
 
 
 
 Pépé le Moko an essay by Michael Atkinson at the Criterion Collection

1937 films
1937 romantic drama films
1937 crime drama films
French romantic drama films
French crime drama films
1930s French-language films
French black-and-white films
French gangster films
Films based on French novels
Films set in Algiers
Films directed by Julien Duvivier
Films produced by Robert and Raymond Hakim
1930s French films